Tradescantia bracteata, the longbract spiderwort, or prairie spiderwort, is a species of Tradescantia. It is native to the northern and central Great Plains and Mississippi Valley regions of the United States, from Arkansas and Oklahoma north to Minnesota and Montana, with a few isolated populations farther east. It is grown for its purple flowers. It blooms from May to July in the US.

References

bracteata
Plants described in 1898
Flora of the Northwestern United States
Garden plants
Flora of the North-Central United States
Flora of the Northeastern United States
Flora without expected TNC conservation status